Joachim Björklund (born 15 March 1971) is a Swedish former professional footballer who played as a centre back. He is the assistant coach of Sarpsborg 08 in the Norwegian Eliteserien.

Beginning his playing career with Östers IF and SK Brann, Björklund went on to win three Swedish championships with IFK Göteborg before representing clubs in the Scottish Premiership, Serie A, La Liga, and the Premier League. A full international between 1992 and 2000, Björklund won 78 caps for the Sweden national team and was a part of the teams that competed at Euro 1992, Euro 2000, and finished third at the 1994 FIFA World Cup.

Club career
Taking the leap from junior team obscurity at Östers IF to becoming a star in Brann, Björklund was later sold to IFK Göteborg. There, his side achieved a surprise 3–1 victory over Manchester United in the group stage of the 1994–95 Champions League which ultimately helped them win Group A ahead of FC Barcelona, Manchester United, and Galatasaray before being eliminated in the quarter-finals by FC Bayern Munich. At the end of the following season, he was transferred to Vicenza in Serie A, and the following year to Rangers in the Scottish Premiership, for £2.2 million. where he won a Scottish league championship medal. He moved to Valencia for £2.5 million on 20 June 1998 and spent three years at Valencia before joining Venezia in Italy, where he played for just one season. While at Valencia, he helped the team reach the 1999–2000 and 2000–01 UEFA Champions League finals.

Björklund joined Sunderland in January 2002 for £1.5 million, but was unable to prevent them from being relegated in the following 2002–03 season. However the 2003–04 season was better, as he helped Sunderland finish third in Division One and reach the FA Cup semi finals yet his services were deemed to be no longer required by manager Mick McCarthy so he joined Wolverhampton Wanderers, who had just been relegated from the Premier League. He left the club and retired after just one injury-hampered season that restricted him to just five appearances in total as the club failed to win an immediate return to the top flight.

International career
For many years he formed a successful central defensive partnership with Patrik Andersson for the Swedish national team. Björklund was selected for the UEFA Euro 1992, 1994 FIFA World Cup and UEFA Euro 2000. At the 1994 FIFA World Cup, he helped the team finish third behind Brazil and Italy. He was also a member of the Swedish squad that competed at the 1992 Summer Olympics in Barcelona.

Due to lack of playing time at his club Valencia, Björklund was dropped from the Swedish squad during the early stages of the 2002 FIFA World Cup qualifying. Disappointed, he decided to retire from the national team at the age of 30.

Post-playing career
Having finished his playing career, he worked as a scout for Valencia, mainly targeting the Nordic countries. He also worked as a pundit for Swedish Canal+, covering La Liga football, for several years.

Assistant at Hammarby IF
On 28 January 2018, Björklund was appointed assistant coach of Hammarby IF in Allsvenskan, under head coach Stefan Billborn. In their first season, the club finished 4th in the table, after being placed first in the league mid-season.

In 2019, Hammarby started the league play in a mediocre fashion, but made a strong finish to the season (with eight straight wins during between match day 22 and 30) and ultimately finished 3rd in Allsvenskan. This meant that the club qualified for the 2020–21 UEFA Europa League, their first continental competition in over ten years.

On 5 January 2020, both Billborn and Björklund signed a three-year contract extension with Hammarby. In a season postponed due to the COVID-19 pandemic, the side disappointedly finished 8th in the table. The club won 3–0 against Puskás Akadémia in the first round of the 2020–21 UEFA Europa League, but was eliminated from the tournament in the second round against Lech Poznań through a 0–3 loss.

On 30 May 2021, Björklund won the 2020–21 Svenska Cupen with Hammarby IF, through a 5–4 win on penalties (0–0 after full-time) against BK Häcken in the final. On 11 June 2021, Hammarby decided to terminate Stefan Billborn's contract, with the club placed 8th in the 2021 Allsvenskan table after eight rounds, although Björklund stayed in his position for the rest of the year.

Assistant at Sarpsborg 08
On 9 January 2022, Björklund reunited with Stefan Billborn, becoming his assistant coach at Sarpsborg 08 in the Norwegian Eliteserien.

Personal life
He is the son of Swedish football coach Karl-Gunnar Björklund, and the father of footballers Kalle Björklund who represented Hammarby IF, Västerås SK and Falkenberg FF and William Björklund who belonged to the Hammarby youth teams and now play for United IK Nordic. His maternal uncle is Tommy Svensson, the Sweden national football team manager from 1991 to 1997.

Career statistics

International

Honours

Player
IFK Göteborg

 Allsvenskan: 1993, 1994, 1995

Rangers
 Scottish Premier Division: 1996–97
 Scottish League Cup: 1996–97

Valencia
 Copa del Rey: 1998–99
 Supercopa de España: 1999
 UEFA Champions League runner-up: 1999–2000, 2000–01
 UEFA Intertoto Cup: 1998
Sweden

 FIFA World Cup third place: 1994

Manager
Hammarby IF
 Svenska Cupen: 2020–21 (assistant coach)

References

External links

1971 births
Living people
People from Växjö
1994 FIFA World Cup players
Swedish footballers
Association football central defenders
Sweden international footballers
Sweden youth international footballers
Olympic footballers of Sweden
Footballers at the 1992 Summer Olympics
UEFA Euro 1992 players
UEFA Euro 2000 players
Allsvenskan players
Eliteserien players
Serie A players
Scottish Football League players
La Liga players
Premier League players
English Football League players
Östers IF players
SK Brann players
IFK Göteborg players
L.R. Vicenza players
Rangers F.C. players
Valencia CF players
Venezia F.C. players
Sunderland A.F.C. players
Wolverhampton Wanderers F.C. players
Hammarby Fotboll non-playing staff
Sarpsborg 08 FF non-playing staff
Swedish expatriate footballers
Swedish expatriate sportspeople in Norway
Expatriate footballers in Norway
Swedish expatriate sportspeople in Italy
Expatriate footballers in Italy
Swedish expatriate sportspeople in Scotland
Expatriate footballers in Scotland
Swedish expatriate sportspeople in Spain
Expatriate footballers in Spain
Swedish expatriate sportspeople in England
Expatriate footballers in England
Sportspeople from Kronoberg County